The following is a list of notable deaths in July 2005.

Entries for each day are listed alphabetically by surname. A typical entry lists information in the following sequence:
 Name, age, country of citizenship at birth, subsequent country of citizenship (if applicable), reason for notability, cause of death (if known), and reference.

July 2005

1
Renaldo "Obie" Benson, 69, American soul and R&B singer and member of The Four Tops, lung cancer.
Rex Berry, 80, American football player.
Gus Bodnar, 82, Canadian ice hockey player.
Bill Frink, 78, American Sportscaster (WLS-TV).
Ivan Kolev, 74, Bulgarian football player.
Arvo Ojala, 85, American technical advisor and actor, gun accident.
Luther Vandross, 54, American R&B singer, complications following a heart attack.

2
Florence Kirsch, 90, American classical pianist.
Ernest Lehman, 89, American screenwriter (Who's Afraid of Virginia Woolf, North by Northwest, West Side Story).
Kenneth Pinyan, 45, American Boeing engineer, perforated colon after having sex with a horse.
Norm Prescott, 78, American co-founder of Filmation animation studios.
Martin Sanchez, 26, Mexican boxer, of injuries sustained in July 1 bout.

3
Siv Ericks, 87, Swedish character actress.
Nan Kempner, 74, American society hostess.
Alberto Lattuada, 90, Italian film director.
Pierre Michelot, 77, French jazz bassist, played with Miles Davis.
Gaylord Nelson, 89, American politician, former Governor of Wisconsin, U.S. Senator from Wisconsin and founder of Earth Day.
Wenten Rubuntja, Australian artist and indigenous activist.
Sam Tata, 93, Canadian photographer.
Hedy West, 67, American folksinger.
Harrison Young, 75, American actor (Saving Private Ryan, House of 1000 Corpses, Passions).

4
Chris Bunch, 62, American science fiction writer, lung ailment.
Gustav-Adolf Bursche, 86, German World War II officer.
Bryan Coleman, 94, British television and film actor.
Al Downing, 65, American R&B and country & western musician, leukaemia.
June Haver, 79, American film actress, widow of Fred MacMurray.
Marga López, 81, Mexican screen and television actress, heart failure.
Hank Stram, 82, American National Football League coach (Kansas City Chiefs) and a member of the Pro Football Hall of Fame.
Lorenzo Thomas, 60, Panamanian-born American poet.

5
Leo Breiman, 77, American statistician.
Ray Davis, 65, American singer, founding member of Parliament/Funkadelic.
Shirley Goodman, 69, American R&B singer.
Baloo Gupte, 70, Indian Test cricketer.
James Stockdale, 81, American Vice Admiral, Medal of Honor recipient, ex-prisoner of war and independent VP Candidate in 1992.

6
Bruno Augenstein, 82, German-born American mathematician and physicist.
L. Patrick Gray, 88, American former Director of the United States FBI, pancreatic cancer.
James Haskins, 63, American professor, biographer, and author.
Huang Kun, 85, Chinese physicist.
Ed McBain, 78, American mystery novel writer, wrote under numerous pseudonyms (Ed McBain), cancer of the larynx.
Donald McGinley, 85, American politician, U.S. Representative from Nebraska (1959–1961) and Lieutenant Governor of Nebraska (1983–1987).
Patrick S. Parker, 75, American businessman (Parker Hannifin).
Dick Sabot, 61, American economist, Internet entrepreneur, co-founder of tripod.com.
Frank Shipston, 98, English cricketer.
Claude Simon, 91, French writer and Nobel Prize winner.
Grace Thaxton, 114, American supercentenarian, oldest resident of Kentucky and oldest person ever born in New York.

7
Norman Bennett, 82, English rugby player and cricketer.
Henri Betti, 87, French composer and pianist.
Paul Deliège, 74, Belgian comic book writer/artist.
Hasib Hussain, 18, British terrorist.
Mohammad Sidique Khan, 30, British terrorist.
Germaine Lindsay, 19, British terrorist.
Ihab al-Sherif, 51, Egyptian envoy in Iraq.
Gustaf Sobin, 69, American-born poet and novelist.
Shehzad Tanweer, 22, British terrorist.

8
Denis Bray, 78, British civil servant in Hong Kong.
Lee Hun Hoe, 79, Malaysian lawyer and judge.
Julian Letterlough, 35, American boxer
Judy Mann, 61, American longtime columnist for The Washington Post.
Dorothy H. Rose, 84, American politician.

9
Chuck Cadman, 57, Canadian Member of Parliament.
Yevgeny Grishin, 74, Russian speed skater, first speed skater under 40 seconds on 500 metres.
Kevin Hagen, 77, American actor (Little House on the Prairie).
Byron Preiss, 52, American writer/editor/publisher.
Alex Shibicky, 91, Canadian ice hockey player who made the first slapshot.
Rafique Zakaria, 79, Indian Islamic scholar.

10
Richard Eastham, 89, American actor (Tombstone Territory, That Darn Cat!, Wonder Woman).
Frank Moores, 72, Canadian politician, Premier of Newfoundland.
A. J. Quinnell, 65, English writer, Man on Fire.
Freda Wright-Sorce, 50, American wife of Don Geronimo of the Don and Mike Show.
Jack Tripp, 83, British pantomime dame.
Freddy Soto, 35, American comedian and actor.

11
Keith Alexander, 41, American guitarist.
Piero Cappuccilli, 78, Italian opera singer.
Ole Christian Bach, 48, Norwegian fraudster.
Gretchen Franklin, 94, English television actress, best known as "Ethel Skinner" in EastEnders.
Shinya Hashimoto, 40, Japanese professional wrestler.
Jesus Ricardo Iglesias, 83, Argentine Grand Prix racing driver.
Frances Langford, 92, American singer/actress.

12
Meyer Cardin, 97, American jurist.
Joseph Patrick Delaney, 70, American Roman Catholic bishop of the diocese of Fort Worth, Texas for many years.
Arthur Fletcher, 80, American government official, Assistant Labor Secretary under US President Richard Nixon, called the "father of affirmative action".
John King, Baron King of Wartnaby, 87, British peer, businessman and chairman of British Airways from 1981 to 1993.
John Thorley, 78, Welsh rugby union and rugby league footballer.
P. K. Vasudevan Nair, 79, Indian politician, Member of Lok Sabha, former Chief Minister of Kerala state, India.

13
Robert P. Abelson, 76, American psychologist and political scientist.
Sir David Brown, 77, British admiral.
Asen Kisimov, 69, Bulgarianactor, singer and radio presenter.
Bob Maslen-Jones, 84, British Olympic shooter.
Robert E. Ogren, 83, American zoologist.
Mickey Owen, 89, American former MLB player for the Brooklyn Dodgers.
Erik Rauch, 31, American biophysicist and  theoretical ecologist, hiking accident.

14
 Mark Carlisle, Baron Carlisle of Bucklow, 76, British politician and peer.
Tilly Fleischer, 93, German athlete, Olympic champion in javelin (1936).
Richard Leiterman, 70, Canadian award-winning cinematographer.
Matt Patrick, 86, Scottish footballer.
Jacques Roche, early 40s, Haitian journalist.
Dame Cicely Saunders, 87, British palliative care activist, founded St. Christopher's Hospice (where she herself died), cancer.
J. B. Trapp, 79, New Zealand historian.

15
David Daiches, 92, Scottish literary critic.
Anne Drungis, 73, American Olympic fencer.
Michael Gibson, 60, American Tony-nominated orchestrator and musician.
Kenneth Graham, 82, British trade unionist.
Sir Ronald Wilson, 82, Australian High Court justice.

16
Mira Ashby, 84, Canadian physician.
Blue Barron, 92, American orchestra leader.
Pietro Consagra, 84, Italian sculptor.
W. Fox McKeithen, 58, American politician, 5-time Louisiana Secretary of State.
John Ostrom, 77, American paleontologist who revolutionized understanding of dinosaurs.
Miguel Pérez, 68, Puerto Rican wrestler.
Helen Bonchek Schneyer, 84, American folk musician.
K. V. Subbanna, 73, Indian dramatist and writer.

17
Laurel Aitken, 77, Jamaican musician.
Biplab Dasgupta, 66, Indian economist
Geraldine Fitzgerald, 91, Irish-born American actress, Alzheimer's disease.
Sir Edward Heath, 89, British politician, Prime Minister (1970–1974), MP (1950–2001), pneumonia.
Gina Lagorio, 83, Italian writer.
Gavin Lambert, 80, British-born American novelist, screenwriter (Inside Daisy Clover, Sons and Lovers).
I. G. Patel, 80, Indian economist, Governor of the Reserve Bank of India (1977–1982).
Joe Vialls, Australian writer.
William Weatherspoon, 69, American songwriter and record producer.

18
Elizabeth Blodgett Hall, 95, American educationist.
Paul Duke, 78, American political journalist.
Amy Gillett, 29, Australian rower and cyclist.
John Herald, 66, American folk musician, recording artist, member of The Greenbriar Boys Vanguard Records.
Jim Parker, 71, American football player, offensive tackle for the Baltimore Colts and member of the Pro Football Hall of Fame.
Gerry Thomas, 83, American marketing and sales executive, innovator, inventor of the TV dinner, cancer.
William Westmoreland, 91, U.S. Army General who commanded American military operations in the Vietnam War from 1964 to 1968.

19
Jim Aparo, 72, American comic book artist (Batman, Phantom Stranger, Spectre).
Alain Bombard, 80, French biologist and physician.
Edward Bunker, 71, American author, screenwriter, and actor (Mr. Blue in Reservoir Dogs).
John D. Cartano, 96, American lawyer.
LaVena Johnson, 19, African-American private first class.
Hastings Keith, 89, American politician, United States Representative from Massachusetts, served 1959 - 1973, as a member of the Republican Party.
John Tyndall, 71, British Neo-Nazi political activist, founder of the British National Party.

20
Charles Chibitty, 83, American last surviving Comanche code talker.
James Doohan, 85, Canadian actor (best known for his role as Scotty on the original Star Trek), pneumonia and Alzheimer's disease.
Finn Gustavsen, 79, Norwegian politician.
Kayo Hatta, 47, American film director (Picture Bride).
David Tomblin, 74, British film and television director.

21
Bryn Allen, 84, Welsh footballer.
Long John Baldry, 64, British blues musician.
Bruce Bolt, 75, Australian-born American scientist and earthquake expert.
Andrzej Grubba, 47, Polish table tennis player.
Lord Alfred Hayes, 76, British wrestler and wrestling commentator (most notably with the WWF).
Ian Robertson, Lord Robertson, 92, Scottish judge.
Shirley Thomas, 85, American space historian, Hollywood producer, and USC professor.

22
Jean-Charles de Menezes, 27, Brazilian electrician, shot by police.
William Beatley, 81, British Olympic fencer.
Jerry Marcus, 81, American cartoonist (Trudy).
Eugene Record, 64, American lead vocalist for The Chi-Lites.
Hinako Sugiura, 46, Japanese author and cartoonist.
George D. Wallace, 88, American actor (Forbidden Planet, The Pajama Game).
Xue Muqiao, 100, Chinese economist, director of National Bureau of Statistics.

23
Ray Crist, 105, American centenarian and chemist.
Joseph Dessertine, 82, French cyclist.
Myron Floren, 85, American musician, longtime accordionist/bandleader on The Lawrence Welk Show.
John Hunt, 87, American oceanographer.
Gaston Mayordomo, 82, French Olympic athlete 
Fintan Meyler, 75, Irish actress.
Ray Oldham, 54, American football player, former NFL cornerback, Pittsburgh Steelers.

24
Viktor Berkovsky, 73, Russian bard.
George Buhr, 76, American football coach.
Sir Richard Doll, 92, British epidemiologist, first person to link cigarette smoking and lung cancer.
Pavel Dostál, 62, Czech minister for cultural affairs.
Fraser McLuskey, 90, Scottish military chaplain and minister.
Francis Ona, 52, Papua New Guinean Bougainville rebel leader.
Radomir Pavitchevitch, 96, French legionnaire.

25
Enrique Bautista, 71, Filipino Olympic athlete.
Paul Britten Austin, 83, British writer and broadcaster.
Giulio Cantoni, 89, Italian-born American physician.
Eddie Crook, Jr., 76, US Olympic boxer and Vietnam veteran.
Sidney Hertzberg, 82,  American basketball player.
David Jackson, 71, British actor.
Alf Joint, 77, British stuntman (Goldfinger, Superman, Return of the Jedi).
Maria do Couto Maia-Lopes, 114, Portuguese supercentenarian, oldest person ever documented in Portugal.
Albert Mangelsdorff, 76, German trombonist.
Ford Rainey, 96, American actor (3:10 to Yuma, Halloween II, The Bionic Woman).

26
Betty Astell, 93, American actress, entertainer and widow of Cyril Fletcher.
Mario David, 71, Italian footballer.
John Edwards, 93, Canadian footballer.
Alexander Golitzen, 97, Russian-born American production designer (To Kill a Mockingbird, Spartacus, Phantom of the Opera), Oscar winner (1944, 1961, 1963).
Jack Hirshleifer, 79, American economist.
Gilles Marotte, 60, Canadian ice hockey player (Los Angeles Kings, Chicago Blackhawks, New York Rangers), pancreatic cancer.
Danny Simon, 85, American comedy writer, brother of Neil Simon.

27
Shelley Appleton, 86, American labor leader.
Tungia Baker, 64, New Zealand Māori actress (The Piano) and artist.
Pierre Broué, 79, French Trotskyist historian.
Al Held, 76, American abstract painter.
Helen Phillips, 86, American opera singer.
Dom Um Romão, 79, Brazilian jazz drummer.
Marten Toonder, 93, Dutch author and cartoonist.
Robert Wright, 90, American musical lyricist (team of Wright & Forrest – Grand Hotel, Kismet, Song of Norway, etc.).

28
Ian Baker, 77, British Army general.
Christopher Bunting, 80, English cellist.
Virginia Dehn, 82, American painter and printmaker.
Louis Metzger, 88, United States Marine Corps officer.
Jair da Rosa Pinto, 84, Brazilian footballer.
Bergur Sigurbjörnsson, 88, Icelandic politician.

29
Hermione Hammond, 94, English painter and portrait artist.
Mile Lojpur, 75, Yugoslav/Serbian rock musician, heart attack.
Pat McCormick, 78, American television writer (The Tonight Show Starring Johnny Carson) and actor (Smokey and the Bandit, Scrooged).
Al McKibbon, 86, American jazz double bassist.
Hildegarde, 99, American cabaret singer.
Fred Sledge Smith, 72, American R&B songwriter and record producer.
Karlheinz Zöller, 76, German flutist.

30
Carl Beam, 62, Canadian Ojibwe artist.
Georges Briard, 88, Russian-born American designer.
Ray Cunningham, 100, American baseball player, recognized as the oldest living former Major League Baseball player.
John Garang, 60, Sudanese Vice President, helicopter crash.
Malucha Solari, 84, Nicaraguan-born Chilean ballerina and choreographer.
Lucky Thompson, 81, American saxophonist.

31
Wim Duisenberg, 70, Dutch banker and politician, suffered a heart attack while swimming and drowned.
Armando Ferreira, 85, Portuguese footballer.
Léopold Gernaey, 78, Belgian footballer.
Mantle Hood, 87, American ethnomusicologist.
Lawrence Teeter, 56, American lawyer, attempted to have Sirhan Sirhan retried, saying he did not kill Robert F. Kennedy, lymphoma.

References

2005-07
 07